Schizoglyphus is a monotypic genus of mites belonging to the monotypic family Schizoglyphidae. The only species is Schizoglyphus biroi.

References 

Sarcoptiformes
Acari genera
Monotypic arachnid genera